The 2011 China Open was a tennis tournament played on outdoor hard courts. It was the 13th edition of the China Open for the men (15th for the women), and was part of the ATP 500 Series of the 2011 ATP World Tour, and of the Premier Series of the 2011 WTA Tour. Both the men's and the women's events were held at the Olympic Green Tennis Center in Beijing, People's Republic of China, from October 1 through October 9, 2011.

Points and prize money

Point distribution

Prize money

WTA entrants

Seeds

 Rankings are as of September 26, 2011.

Other entrants
The following players received wildcards into the singles main draw:
  Gisela Dulko
  Hu Yueyue
  Zhang Shuai
  Zheng Jie
  Zheng Saisai

The following players received entry from the qualifying draw:

  Eleni Daniilidou
  Christina McHale
  Monica Niculescu
  Virginie Razzano
  Laura Robson
  Chanelle Scheepers
  Carla Suárez Navarro
  Barbora Záhlavová-Strýcová

Withdrawals
  Maria Sharapova
  Yanina Wickmayer
  Serena Williams
  Venus Williams

ATP entrants

Seeds

 Rankings are as of September 26, 2011.

Other entrants
The following players received wildcards into the singles main draw:
  Li Zhe
  Wu Di
  Zhang Ze

The following players received entry from the qualifying draw:

  Flavio Cipolla
  Marsel İlhan
  Philipp Kohlschreiber
  Albert Ramos

The following players received entry from a lucky loser spot:
  Grega Žemlja
  Paul Capdeville
  Teymuraz Gabashvili

Withdrawals
  Novak Djokovic (muscle torn) 
  Richard Gasquet (elbow injury) 
  Robin Söderling
  Gaël Monfils (knee injury)
  Nikolay Davydenko
  John Isner (abdominal strain)

Champions

Men's singles

 Tomáš Berdych def.  Marin Čilić, 3–6, 6–4, 6–1
 It was Berdych's 1st title of the year and the 6th of his career.

Women's singles

 Agnieszka Radwańska def.  Andrea Petkovic, 7–5, 0–6, 6–4
It was Radwańska's 3rd title of the year and 7th of her career.

Men's doubles

 Michaël Llodra /  Nenad Zimonjić def.  Robert Lindstedt /  Horia Tecău, 7–6(7–2), 7–6(7–4)

Women's doubles

 Květa Peschke /  Katarina Srebotnik def.  Gisela Dulko /  Flavia Pennetta, 6–3, 6–4

References

External links
Official website

 
China Open
China Open
2011
Open (tennis)
October 2011 sports events in China